Gulf Shores City Schools (GSCS), also known as Gulf Shores Board of Education (GSBOE), is a school district headquartered in Gulf Shores, Alabama in the United States.

 it had about 2,500 pupils.

History
Previously Gulf Shores was in the Baldwin County School District. In 2017 all members of the Gulf Shores city council voted to establish the city's own school system. In 2019 the Baldwin County district and Gulf Shores made a formal agreement for Gulf Shores to separate.

On June 1, 2019 the school district formally started its operations. This made it the first school district to separate from the Baldwin County district.

The school district was scheduled to begin operations in 2019. The anticipated initial enrollment was 2,250.

Schools
 Gulf Shores High School
 Gulf Shores Middle School
 Gulf Shores Elementary School

References

External links
 Gulf Shores City Schools

School districts in Alabama
2010s establishments in Alabama
2019 establishments in the United States
Education in Baldwin County, Alabama
Educational institutions established in 2019